Alexander Russell may refer to:

Alexander Russell (naturalist) (1715–1768), British physician and naturalist
Alexander Russell (priest) (1803–1886), Dean of Adelaide
Lord Alexander Russell (1821–1907), British Army general
Alexander Russell (electrical engineer) (1861–1943), Scottish electrical engineer and educator
Alexander Russell (composer) (1880–1953), American composer, pianist, organist, impresario and the first Frick Professor of Music for Princeton University
Alexander Russell (politician) (1879–1961), British Member of Parliament for Tynemouth, 1922–1945
Sir Fraser Russell (Alexander Fraser Russell, 1876–1952), acting Governor of Southern Rhodesia
Alexander Russell (cricketer) (born 1998), English cricketer
Alexander Russel (1814–1876), Scottish newspaper editor
Alexander Durie Russell (1872–1955), Scottish mathematician and astronomer
Alexander James Russell (1814–1887), Scottish lawyer

See also
Alex Russell (disambiguation)